The 24th TVyNovelas Awards, is an Academy of special awards to the best of soap operas and TV shows. The awards ceremony took place on May 13, 2006 at Forum Mundo Imperial, Acapulco, Guerrero. The ceremony was televised in the Mexico by Canal de las estrellas.

Eduardo Santamarina and Joana Benedek hosted the show. Alborada won 7 awards, including Best Telenovela, the most for the evening. Other winners La madrastra and Rebelde won 2 awards and La esposa virgen, Piel de otoño and Pablo y Andrea won one award each.

Summary of awards and nominations

Winners and nominees

Novelas

Others

Special Awards
Special Award for Artistic Career: Raúl Velasco
Special Award for her 33 year Artistic Career: Daniela Romo
Special Recognition for his Career: Joaquín Cordero

Missing
People who did not attend ceremony wing and were nominated in the shortlist in each category:
Adela Noriega
César Évora (He was not present in the nomination for Best Actor)
Joaquín Cordero
Laura Pausini
Lilia Aragón
Macarena Miguel
Nashla Aguilar
Natalia Esperón
Ninel Conde
Sebastián

References 

TVyNovelas Awards
TVyNovelas Awards
TVyNovelas Awards
TVyNovelas Awards ceremonies